Divizia A1 may refer to:

 Divizia A1 (women's volleyball), Romania
 Divizia A1 (men's volleyball), Romania